Alexander Harold Oakley (April 28, 1926 – October 24, 2010) was a race walker from Canada, who represented his native country at five Summer Olympics, starting in 1956. His best finish was the sixth place in the men's 50 km walk at the 1960 Summer Olympics in Rome, Italy. He won the 20 km event at the 1963 Pan American Games. He was born in St. John's, Newfoundland and Labrador. Aged 50 when he made his final Olympic appearance in 1976, he is the oldest person ever to compete in a track and field event at the Olympics.

References

External links
 
 Alex Oakley's obituary
 
 

1926 births
2010 deaths
Canadian male racewalkers
Athletes (track and field) at the 1956 Summer Olympics
Athletes (track and field) at the 1960 Summer Olympics
Athletes (track and field) at the 1963 Pan American Games
Athletes (track and field) at the 1964 Summer Olympics
Athletes (track and field) at the 1966 British Empire and Commonwealth Games
Athletes (track and field) at the 1972 Summer Olympics
Athletes (track and field) at the 1970 British Commonwealth Games
Athletes (track and field) at the 1976 Summer Olympics
Commonwealth Games competitors for Canada
Pan American Games gold medalists for Canada
Pan American Games medalists in athletics (track and field)
Olympic track and field athletes of Canada
Sportspeople from St. John's, Newfoundland and Labrador
Medalists at the 1963 Pan American Games